Isomerocera is a genus of flies in the family Stratiomyidae.

Species
Isomerocera heteraspis James, 1949
Isomerocera quadrilineata (Fabricius, 1787)

References

Stratiomyidae
Brachycera genera
Taxa named by Günther Enderlein
Diptera of Africa